Gymnogryllus is a genus of crickets in family Gryllidae and tribe Gryllini.  Species are recorded from Africa, Asia and Australia.

Taxonomy
The genus contains the following species:

Gymnogryllus amani Otte, Toms & Cade, 1988
Gymnogryllus angustus (Saussure, 1877)
Gymnogryllus birmanus Chopard, 1928
Gymnogryllus borneensis Ichikawa, 1996
Gymnogryllus brachyxiphus Chopard, 1931
Gymnogryllus brevicauda Chopard, 1937
Gymnogryllus brevipennis Chopard, 1934
Gymnogryllus capensis Otte, Toms & Cade, 1988
Gymnogryllus castaneus Bolívar, 1910
Gymnogryllus caviceps (Karsch, 1893)
Gymnogryllus chabanaudi Chopard, 1925
Gymnogryllus compactus (Walker, 1869)
Gymnogryllus contractus Liu, Yin & Liu, 1995
Gymnogryllus corroboree Otte & Alexander, 1983
Gymnogryllus cylindricollis (Bolívar, 1910)
Gymnogryllus dinictis Gorochov, 2011
Gymnogryllus dolichodens Ma & Zhang, 2011
Gymnogryllus ebneri (Chopard, 1927)
Gymnogryllus equinus Gorochov, 2001
Gymnogryllus extrarius Ma & Zhang, 2011
Gymnogryllus fascipes Chopard, 1969
Gymnogryllus joburgensis Otte, Toms & Cade, 1988
Gymnogryllus kashmirensis Bhowmik, 1967
Gymnogryllus kuznetzovi Gorochov, 1992
Gymnogryllus leucostictus (Burmeister, 1838) - type species (as Gryllus elegans Guérin-Méneville)
Gymnogryllus longus Ma & Zhang, 2011
Gymnogryllus machairodus Gorochov, 1996
Gymnogryllus malayanus Desutter-Grandcolas, 1996
Gymnogryllus manokwari Gorochov, 2011
Gymnogryllus novaeguineae Chopard, 1937
Gymnogryllus obscurus Gorochov, 2011
Gymnogryllus odonopetalus  Xie & Zheng, 2003
Gymnogryllus pravdini Gorochov, 1990
Gymnogryllus pulvillatus (Saussure, 1877)
Gymnogryllus smilodon Gorochov, 1996
Gymnogryllus striatus Ma & Zhang, 2011
Gymnogryllus sylvestris Gorochov, 2011
Gymnogryllus tumidulus Ma & Zhang, 2011
Gymnogryllus unexpectus Gorochov & Kostia, 1999
Gymnogryllus vicinus (Chopard, 1955)
Gymnogryllus vietnamensis Gorochov, 1992
Gymnogryllus yunnanensis Ma & Zhang, 2011

References

Gryllinae
Orthoptera genera
Taxa named by Henri Louis Frédéric de Saussure